After Many Years can refer to:

 After Many Years (1908 film), a 1908 American film
 After Many Years (1930 film), a 1930 British film